Tag 91.1 (stylized TAG 91.1) is a radio station in Dubai, United Arab Emirates. It is one of the nine radio stations under the Arabian Radio Network (ARN). It caters to the Filipinos in the UAE, as it is the first Filipino-language premium station there.

Tag 91.1 was launched on March 24, 2013 and started airing a day later (March 25).

Disc jockeys
Tag 91.1 calls its disc jockeys as RJs (radio jocks).
 Bluebird (Joselito F. Echivarria)
 Keri Belle
 Pepper Reu
 Louie da Costa (Louise Serrano - da Costa) (formerly of Citylite 88.3 (now Jam 88.3) and Virgin Radio 104.4) 
 Maria Maldita (Jonaphine Caraan) (former DJ of 101.1 Yes FM (now 101.1 Yes The Best))
 Johnny Biryani (formerly of 103.9 iFM Baguio)
 Georgia Fritada
 Alfred Ryce
 Andy Sal

Programs

See also
 Radio and television channels of Dubai

Awards 
Ahlan Best in Dubai - Best Radio Station Oct 2013

References

External links
 

Filipino diaspora
Filipino-language radio stations
Mass media in Dubai
Radio stations established in 2013
Radio stations in the United Arab Emirates